Kordi Chal (also Romanized as Kordī Chāl; also known as Kodīchāl, Kodī Chāl, Kolī Chāl, and Kurdichal) is a village in Kelardasht-e Sharqi Rural District, Kelardasht District, Chalus County, Mazandaran Province, Iran. At the 2006 census, its population was 1,466, in 435 families.

References 

Populated places in Chalus County